A total solar eclipse occurred on November 19, 1816. A solar eclipse occurs when the Moon passes between Earth and the Sun, thereby totally or partly obscuring the image of the Sun for a viewer on Earth. A total solar eclipse occurs when the Moon's apparent diameter is larger than the Sun's, blocking all direct sunlight, turning day into darkness. Totality occurs in a narrow path across Earth's surface, with the partial solar eclipse visible over a surrounding region thousands of kilometres wide.

Observations 

From Germany, this total eclipse could not be seen with clouded sky except by few observers at Pomerania only.

Capel Lofft observed this eclipse from Ipswich.

Related eclipses 
It is a part of solar Saros 120.

Tritos series

Notes

References

 NASA chart graphics
 Googlemap
 NASA Besselian elements
 The 1816 Solar Eclipse and the Comet 1811I in Linnell's Astronomical Album JOURN. HISTORY OF ASTRONOMY V.23, NO. 2/MAY, P.121, 1992

1816 11 19
1816 in science
1816 11 19
November 1816 events